École élémentaire Les Rapides is a French first language elementary school located in Sarnia, Ontario, Canada. It serves students from throughout Lambton County and Chatham–Kent.

External links 
École élémentaire Les Rapides

Elementary schools in Sarnia
French-language elementary schools in Ontario